Angelique Kerber defeated Kateřina Siniaková in the final, 6–3, 6–2, to win the singles tennis title at the 2021 Bad Homburg Open. It was Kerber's 13th career WTA Tour singles title, her first in three years.

This was the inaugural edition of the tournament.

Seeds

Draw

Finals

Top half

Bottom half

Qualifying

Seeds

Qualifiers

Lucky loser

Draw

First qualifier

Second qualifier

Third qualifier

Fourth qualifier

References

External Links 
 Main Draw
 Qualifying Draw
 WTA website
 Official website

Bad Homburg Opennbsp;- Singles